Michelle Lin or Lin Chu-yin (born 10 October 1972) is a Taiwanese news presenter and politician.

Early career and personal life
Lin was a news anchor for TVBS News and later on with SET News. She married  in 2007.

Political career
Lin was elected to the Legislative Yuan in 2020 via the Democratic Progressive Party proportional representation party list. As a legislator, she has been active in discussions regarding banking, journalism, and online scams.

References

1972 births
Living people
21st-century Taiwanese women politicians
Party List Members of the Legislative Yuan
Members of the 10th Legislative Yuan
Taiwanese television news anchors
Taiwanese women television presenters